Park (also known as Fark) is a village in Jolgeh Rural District, in the Central District of Behabad County, Yazd Province, Iran. At the 2006 census, its population was 120, in 33 families.

References 

Populated places in Behabad County